Elke Winkens, née Fischer (born 25 March 1970 in Linnich) is an Austrian-German actress. She grew up in Germany in the district Ratheim in Hückelhoven. Because of her father's work the family moved to the Netherlands and Belgium; for some time she also resided in Africa. At the age of six she took ballet classes and at the age of nine she started performing on stage. Afterwards she performed in many dance and theater acts. From 1978 to 1986 she was a professional gymnast and won several titles in floor exercise.

At the age of eighteen she got a scholarship at the London Studio Centre in London, where she was stationed between 1989 and 1991. Then she moved to Vienna and participated in the Musical School at the Theater Vienna where she studied song, dance and acting. Later she joined the cabaret performance group Die Hektiker which made her known. She got her first TV acting job in the series Cell-O-Fun  which was broadcast between 1996 and 1997, and then the series called One in 1998. In 2002, she acted in the crime series Inspector Rex where she played the character Niki Herzog.

In 2003, Winkens posed for the German edition of Playboy magazine. And in 2008, she participated in the celebrity dancing show Dancing Stars which was broadcast on ORF. She was voted off just one week before the final.

References

External links 

Living people
1970 births
Austrian actresses
German actresses
German television personalities